William James Whitehouse (1 April 1909 in Plumstead – 14 July 1957 at Reims) was a British racing driver from England.

Bill started racing in a Cooper 500 in 1949 in 500 cc Car Club National races (later Formula 3). Several wins and top placings followed and through this he became friends with fellow car dealer Bernie Ecclestone.  He participated in one Formula One World Championship Grand Prix, on 17 July 1954.  He retired from the race with fuel system problems, and scored no World Championship points. He also competed in several non-Championship Formula One races.
Bill was the owner of Westmount Garage in Blendon, Bexley, Kent. This Garage was later the base for the Gemini Formula Junior Team.
He was killed in a Formula Two crash at the Reims Circuit driving a works car, loaned after his  privately entered Cooper T39 had engine failure. Later in that race the American Herbert MacKay-Fraser was also killed.

Complete Formula One World Championship results
(key)

References

External links
Bill Whitehouse profile at The 500 Owners Association

English racing drivers
English Formula One drivers
Racing drivers who died while racing
1909 births
1957 deaths
Sport deaths in France
People from Plumstead